The Epistle of Ignatius to Polycarp (often abbreviated Ign. Poly.) is an epistle attributed to Ignatius of Antioch, a second-century bishop of Antioch, and addressed to Polycarp, the bishop of Smyrna. It was written during Ignatius' transport from Antioch to his execution in Rome.

Composition

To Polycarp is one of seven epistles attributed to Ignatius that are generally accepted as authentic. In 5th century, this collection was enlarged by spurious letters.

It is clear that To Polycarp was written soon before the martyrdom of Ignatius, but it is uncertain when precisely this martyrdom occurred. Tradition places the martyrdom of Ignatius in the reign of Trajan, who was emperor of Rome from 98 to 117 AD. While many scholars accept the traditional dating of Ignatius' martyrdom under Trajan, others have argued for a somewhat later date. Richard Pervo dated Ignatius' death to 135–140 AD, and British classicist Timothy Barnes has argued for a date some time in the 140s AD.

Content
The epistle contains various exhortations about morally correct behavior, and warnings against false doctrines (Ign. Poly. 2–5). Ignatius also rejoices at the fact that his home church of Antioch is now "at peace":

Scholars such as Pearcy Neale Harrison have argued that Ignatius must be referring to some sort of schism in the Antiochene church which had recently been resolved. Ignatius then asks Polycarp to send a letter to the church in Antioch, congratulating and encouraging them for having resolved their schism:

Ignatius then requests that Polycarp send letters to various churches in Asia Minor, asking them to also send letters of congratulation to Ignatius' home church in Antioch:

Polycarp seems to have responded to this request in Chapter 13 of his epistle to the Philippians, where he refers to a request of Ignatius that the Philippians send a letter to the church in Antioch.

References

2nd-century Christian texts
Apocryphal epistles
Letters (message)
Works by the Church Fathers